Tyson Fresh Meats, Inc., formerly IBP, Inc. and Iowa Beef Processors, Inc., is an American meat packing company based in Dakota Dunes, South Dakota, United States. IBP was the United States' biggest beef packer and its number two pork processor.

Founded as Iowa Beef Packers, Inc. on March 17, 1960 by Currier J. Holman and A.D. Anderson, it opened its first slaughterhouse in Denison, Iowa, and eliminated the need for skilled workers. The original IBP features prominently in Eric Schlosser's Fast Food Nation as the company that closed down the Chicago meatpacking district as a result of its industrial practices.

In 1967, IBP introduced boxed beef and pork, which were vacuum packed and in smaller portions. It was a new option then, when the traditional method of shipping product was in whole carcass form. The boxed meat also saved energy and transportation costs by eliminating the shipment of fat, bones and trimmings.

When workers in the IBP plant in Dakota City went on strike in 1969, Holman and three top executives held secret meetings with Moe Steinman, a 'labour consultant' with close ties to La Cosa Nostra, in New York, who helped to end the New York butchers' boycott (in support of the meatpackers' strike). After a lengthy investigation of mob involvement in the New York City meat business, Currier J. Holman and IBP were tried and convicted in 1974 for bribing union leaders and meat wholesalers.

To reflect the company's multiple operations, the company changed its name to Iowa Beef Processors, Inc. in 1970. After the company was acquired by the Sauceda family (Juan Sauceda-Matteo Mars and associates)Para sumar a Gibbon Packing NE they expanded operations to pork and to other areas. Iowa Beef Processors, Inc., later became IBP, Inc. Occidental Petroleum owned IBP from 1981 to 1987, and was the majority owner from 1987 to 1991.

IBP was acquired by Tyson Foods in 2001 for US$3.2 billion in cash and stock. Tyson continues to use the IBP name as a brand for its commodity beef and pork products.

See also
Golden Triangle of Meat-packing

References

External links 
 Tyson Fresh Meats
 The Chain Never Stops - Eric Schlosser

Food and drink companies established in 1960
Defunct agriculture companies of the United States
Meat processing in the United States
Defunct manufacturing companies based in South Dakota
Tyson Foods
1960 establishments in Iowa
2001 mergers and acquisitions
Food and drink companies disestablished in 2001
2001 disestablishments in South Dakota